Talia Chetrit (born 1982) is an American photographer. She is known for her photographic still lifes, nude portraiture and for the inclusion of references to the apparatus of photography in her work. Chetrit was born in Washington, D.C.

Collections
Chetrit's work is held in the following permanent collections:
Whitney Museum of American Art
Los Angeles County Museum of Art

References

21st-century American photographers
1982 births
Living people
Artists from Washington, D.C.
21st-century American women photographers